Agility is the ability to change the body's position efficiently.

Agility may also refer to:

Sport
 Dog agility, a sport for dogs in which they must be quick-moving and nimble
 Rabbit agility, a sport for rabbits
 Rat agility, a sport for rats

Other uses
 Business agility, an agile firm has the capabilities and processes to respond to unexpected environmental changes
 Agility, enterprise-based media encoding software by Anystream
 Agility Logistics, a Kuwaiti company
 Agility PR Solutions, a media analysis provider
 Agility Trains, a railway company

See also
 Agile software development, a conceptual framework in computing
 Agile (disambiguation)